The Really Really Free Market (RRFM) movement is a horizontally organized collective of individuals who form a temporary market based on an alternative gift economy. RRFM events are often hosted by people unaffiliated with any large organization and are encouraged to sprout up by anyone, anytime, anywhere. The RRFM movement aims to counteract capitalism in a proactive way by creating a positive example to challenge the questioned myths of scarcity and competition. The name Really Really Free Market is itself a play on words as it is a reinterpretation and re-envisioning of the term free market, which generally refers to an economy of competition governed by supply and demand. The RRFM holds as a major goal to build a community based on sharing resources, caring for one another and improving the collective lives of all.  Markets often vary in character, but they generally offer both goods and services. A RRFM usually takes place in an open community space such as a public park or community commons.

Origins and spread 
  The first known Really, Really Free Market took place at a Food Not Bombs meal in Christchurch, New Zealand, as a protest to a meeting on free trade. The Really Really Free Markets started to spread around Asia. Jakarta Food Not Bombs organized a Really Really Free Market on Buy Nothing Day.

The first Really Really Free Market in the United States happened simultaneously in Miami, Florida, and Raleigh, North Carolina, during the anti-globalization protests against the FTAA in 2003. The idea of a "Really, Really Free Market" emerged from a visioning ritual by members of the Pagan Cluster in Austin in preparation of the FTAA Summit in Miami, November 2003. Members of the Green Bloc picked up the idea and made it real. Participants from the SouthEast Anarchist Network (SeaNET) held demonstrations using the Really, Really Free Market to protest the G8 summit in 2004. The idea quickly spread across the United States, Russia, and other countries such as Australia, England, Malaysia, Taiwan, South Africa, and Canada.

In the United States 
The movement has taken root in dozens of cities in the United States, with some holding one-time events, annual, bi-monthly, and even monthly markets.

San Francisco, California 
The San Francisco Really Really Free Market was organized by local activist Kirsten Brydum until her death in 2008. From around 2007 until 2010, it was hosted on the last Saturday of every month in Mission Dolores Park. During 2007–2010 local organizers distributed "seed packets": CDs with a collection of digital flyers, announcements, pictures, and essays. This was part of the ongoing effort to encourage others to start their own RRFM.

See also 

 Anti-capitalism
 Communitarianism
 Diggers (theater)a group of early adopters of the free-store concept
 Direct action
 DIY ethic
 Freeganism
 Give-away shop
 Kashless.org
 Mutual aid
 Regiving
 Pay it forward
 Voluntaryism

References

External links
 How to Start a Really Really Free Market
 SF Really Really FREE Market - Complete Seedpack.zip for download

Anarchist economics
Anarchist movements
Anti-capitalism